Wadi Al Dawasir is a town in Najd, Saudi Arabia, in the Dawasir valley. The town is the homeland of the tribe of Al-Dawasir, the name Dawasir derives from the Arabic word 'Dawsar', the most prominent meaning of that word is Steel Lion.
The municipality had a population of 106,152 at the 2010 Census. It is divided into three main neighborhoods: Alnowaima, Alkhamaseen and Allidam.

Climate
Wadi ad-Dawasir has a hot desert climate (Köppen climate classification BWh).

See also 

 List of cities and towns in Saudi Arabia
 Regions of Saudi Arabia

References 

Populated places in Riyadh Province
Najd
Dawasir